= Kinjhejhi railway station =

Railway station in Pakistan

Coordinates: 25°14′N 69°32′E

Kinjhejhi railway station ڪنجهيجهي ريلوي اسٽيشن

General information
- Owner: Ministry of Railways

Other information
- Station code: KNJE

History
- Former names: Great Indian Peninsula Railway
Location

Kinjhejhi railway station (Urdu: کنجھجھی ریلوے اسٹیشن, Sindhi: ڪنجهيجهي ريلوي اسٽيشن) is located in Pakistan.

== See also ==
- List of railway stations in Pakistan
- Pakistan Railways
